Stones in Exile is a 2010 documentary film about the recording of the 1972 the Rolling Stones album Exile on Main St. Directed by Stephen Kijak, it premiered at the 2010 Cannes Film Festival. It had its worldwide premiere on Late Night with Jimmy Fallon. Fallon announced on his show that he would mark the re-release of the album with a week's worth of musicians performing songs from the album. The final night of the week, he held the premiere.

Charts

References

External links
 

2010 films
Rockumentaries
2010 documentary films
Films produced by John Battsek
The Rolling Stones documentary films
Films directed by Stephen Kijak
2010s English-language films
2010s British films